"Skywriter" is a song written by Mel Larson and Jerry Marcellino, recorded and released by The Jackson 5 in 1973 as the title track from their Skywriter album. As a single, it reached No. 25 on the UK Singles Chart and No. 87 on the Australian Singles Chart.

In 2009 it was remixed by Stargate for The Remix Suite.

Charts

References

1973 singles
The Jackson 5 songs
Motown singles